Michael Jose Ynoa Ventura ( Michel; born September 24, 1991) is a Dominican professional baseball pitcher who is a free agent. He has played in Major League Baseball (MLB) for the Chicago White Sox.

Career

Oakland Athletics
Ynoa signed with the Oakland Athletics of Major League Baseball (MLB) for the amount of $4.25 million, setting a new record for the A's organization after lefty pitcher Mark Mulder was signed for 3.2 million in 1998. Ynoa was named the "Number One" and the "crown jewel" in the "Best Latino Prospects of 2008." Ynoa was said to be the most impressive Latin American player prospect since Félix Hernández in 2002. Two MLB teams (Cincinnati Reds, Texas Rangers) "reportedly offered Ynoa about $5 million." It was reported that Ynoa signed with Oakland after a deal fell through with the New York Yankees.  The Yankees reportedly broke off talks with Ynoa after agent Adam Katz sought to renegotiate a handshake agreement with the club.

In August 2010, after pitching nine innings in the Arizona League, Ynoa underwent Tommy John surgery. Ynoa's contract was selected by the Athletics on November 20, 2012, and he was added to the 40-man roster.

Chicago White Sox
After the 2014 season, the Athletics traded Ynoa and Jeff Samardzija to the Chicago White Sox in exchange for Marcus Semien, Chris Bassitt, Rangel Ravelo, and Josh Phegley.

On June 14, 2016, the White Sox promoted Ynoa to the major leagues. In 45 games over the 2016-2017 seasons, Ynoa compiled a 2-0 record, with a 4.42 ERA in 59 innings. He was released on March 15, 2018.

Kansas City Royals
On November 13, 2018, Ynoa signed a minor league contract with the Kansas City Royals. He was assigned to AAA Omaha Storm Chasers to start the 2019 season. He was released on May 29.

Second stint with Athletics
On February 12, 2020, Ynoa signed a minor league deal with the Oakland Athletics. He became a free agent on November 2, 2020.

Philadelphia Phillies
On December 29, 2020, Ynoa signed a minor league contract with the Philadelphia Phillies organization. On March 27, 2021, Ynoa was released by the Phillies.

Acereros de Monclova
On April 20, 2022, Ynoa signed with the Acereros de Monclova of the Mexican League. In 12 appearances out of the bullpen, Ynoa posted a 1–0 record with a 3.60 ERA over 10.0 innings pitched. He was released by the team on May 24, 2022.

Mariachis de Guadalajara
On May 25, 2022, Ynoa signed with the Mariachis de Guadalajara of the Mexican League. He was released on July 9, 2022.

Spelling of name
"Michel Ynoa" is the original spelling of Ynoa's name. His first name was anglicized from "Michel" to "Michael" after he signed as an amateur with the Oakland Athletics in July 2008. Early in his career, Ynoa's last name was mistakenly spelled "Inoa." He and the Athletics corrected the error in February 2009 and his surname reverted to the original spelling although he maintained the anglicized forename.

Personal life
Ynoa's younger brother, Huascar, is also a professional baseball pitcher.

References

External links

1991 births
Living people
Acereros de Monclova players
Águilas Cibaeñas players
Arizona League Athletics players
Beloit Snappers players
Birmingham Barons players
Charlotte Knights players
Chicago White Sox players
Dominican Republic expatriate baseball players in Mexico
Dominican Republic expatriate baseball players in the United States
Major League Baseball pitchers
Major League Baseball players from the Dominican Republic
Mariachis de Guadalajara players
Omaha Storm Chasers players
People from Puerto Plata, Dominican Republic
Stockton Ports players
Vermont Lake Monsters players
Winston-Salem Dash players